James Madison Pannell (January 31, 1883 - December 27, 1930) was a teacher and Democratic Mississippi state senator, representing the state's 11th senatorial district from 1920 to 1924.

Biography 
James Madison Pannell was born on January 31, 1883, in Wesson, Mississippi. He was the son of Joseph Crockett Pannell and Florence Laura Amanda (Graves) Pannell. He graduated from the University of Mississippi with a B. S. and became a teacher. In November 1919, he was elected to the Mississippi State Senate as a Democrat to represent the state's 11th district from 1920 to 1924. Pannell died on December 27, 1930.

References 

1883 births
1930 deaths
People from Wesson, Mississippi
Democratic Party Mississippi state senators
University of Mississippi alumni